Luz Violeta is the stage name of Sebastián Aguirre, a Chilean drag performer and singer, best known for winning the first season of The Switch Drag Race.

Early life
Aguirre is a rape survivor, having been subjected to the traumatic event at a young age.

On The Switch Drag Race, he revealed that at an early age, his father did not accept his sexuality. However, after seeing him on the show and realizing that drag was a valid career, he became more accepting.

Career 
Luz Violeta was among the cast of 12 drag queens to compete on the first season of The Switch Drag Race. After four months of competing, she was announced as the winner. She returned to compete in the second season, where she made the decision to leave the competition. In addition to The Switch Drag Race, they have competed in other competition shows, including La Divina Comida and Chilean Talent.

Personal life 
Aguirre currently lives in Santiago, Chile. He is a part of a campaign against gender violence with UN Women. In 2016, he survived a stabbing attack.

Aguirre identifies as gay, but has dated women in the past and expressed a willingness to do so again in the future. He maintains an active social media presence on Instagram at @LuzVioletaDrag.

Filmography

Television

See also 
LGBT in Chile

References

External links

Living people
Chilean television personalities
Drag queens
Gay entertainers
Chilean gay men
People from Santiago
Chilean drag queens
Year of birth missing (living people)
The Switch Drag Race
Drag Race (franchise) winners
21st-century Chilean LGBT people